Orchimont Airport  is a private airport located near Vresse-sur-Semois, Namur, Wallonia, Belgium.

See also
List of airports in Belgium

References

External links 
 Airport record for Orchimont Airport at Landings.com

Airports in Namur (province)